Lower Alloways Creek Township is a township in Salem County, in the U.S. state of New Jersey.  As of the 2010 United States Census, the township's population was 1,770, reflecting a decline of 81 (−4.4%) from the 1,851 counted in the 2000 Census, which had in turn declined by 7 (−0.4%) from the 1,858 counted in the 1990 Census.

PSE&G operates three nuclear reactors in Lower Alloways Creek Township. Salem 1 and Salem 2 are pressurized water reactors at the Salem Nuclear Power Plant and the Hope Creek Nuclear Generating Station has one boiling water reactor. Lower Alloways Creek Township is a dry town where alcohol cannot be sold legally.

History 

Lower Alloways Creek Township was formed on June 17, 1767, when Alloways Creek Township was subdivided and Upper Alloways Creek Township (now Alloway Township) was also formed. The township was incorporated by the New Jersey Legislature's Township Act of 1798 on February 21, 1798, as one of New Jersey's original group of 104 townships. The name Alloway is derivative of Allowas, a local Native American chief.

Geography

According to the United States Census Bureau, the township had a total area of 72.53 square miles (187.84 km2), including 45.31 square miles (117.35 km2) of land and 27.22 square miles (70.49 km2) of water (37.53%).

Hancock's Bridge (with a 2010 Census population of 254) is an unincorporated community and census-designated place (CDP) located within Lower Alloways Creek Township, and home to the township's municipal building, police station and a post office.

The township includes the great majority of Artificial Island, the northern tip of which is crossed east-westward by the New Jersey-Delaware state line, so it borders a tiny portion of New Castle County, Delaware, which is one of two areas of land of Delaware (and New Castle County) that is east of the Delaware River, the other being Finns Point, also part of New Castle County, DE, adjacent to Pennsville Township.

Other unincorporated communities, localities and place names located partially or completely within the township include Alder Cove, Arnold Point, Canton, Cumberland, Harmersville, Haskells Mills, Maskellers Mill, New Bridge and Woods Landing.

The township borders the Salem County municipalities of Elsinboro Township, Quinton Township and Salem. Lower Alloways Creek Township also borders the Delaware Bay, Cumberland County and a small point of land that is located within Delaware's Twelve-Mile Circle.

Demographics

Census 2010

The Census Bureau's 2006–2010 American Community Survey showed that (in 2010 inflation-adjusted dollars) median household income was $66,384 (with a margin of error of +/− $3,808) and the median family income was $72,969 (+/− $7,867). Males had a median income of $46,964 (+/− $6,435) versus $43,083 (+/− $8,815) for females. The per capita income for the borough was $27,325 (+/− $2,057). About none of families and 1.8% of the population were below the poverty line, including none of those under age 18 and 3.0% of those age 65 or over.

Census 2000

As of the 2000 United States Census there were 1,851 people, 693 households, and 537 families residing in the township. There were 730 housing units at an average density of 15.6 per square mile (6.0/km2). The racial makeup of the township was 96.38% White, 2.16% African American, 0.11% Native American, 0.65% Asian, 0.16% from other races, and 0.54% from two or more races. Hispanic or Latino people of any race were 0.49% of the population.

There were 693 households, out of which 31.7% had children under the age of 18 living with them, 66.7% were married couples living together, 7.5% had a female householder with no husband present, and 22.4% were non-families. 18.2% of all households were made up of individuals, and 8.9% had someone living alone who was 65 years of age or older.  The average household size was 2.67 and the average family size was 3.00.

In the township the population was spread out, with 24.4% under the age of 18, 6.2% from 18 to 24, 29.3% from 25 to 44, 26.1% from 45 to 64, and 13.9% who were 65 years of age or older.  The median age was 40 years. For every 100 females, there were 93.4 males.  For every 100 females age 18 and over, there were 94.2 males.

The median income for a household in the township was $55,078, and the median income for a family was $59,653. Males had a median income of $44,081 versus $30,313 for females. The per capita income for the township was $21,962.  About 4.2% of families and 7.3% of the population were below the poverty line, including 14.7% of those under age 18 and 3.1% of those age 65 or over.

Government

Local government 
Lower Alloways Creek Township is governed under the Township form of New Jersey municipal government, one of 141 municipalities (of the 564) statewide that use this form, the second-most commonly used form of government in the state. The Township Committee is comprised of five members, who are elected directly by the voters at-large in partisan elections to serve three-year terms of office on a staggered basis, with either one or two seats coming up for election each year as part of the November general election in a three-year cycle. At an annual reorganization meeting, the Township Committee selects one of its members to serve as Mayor and another as Deputy Mayor.

, members of the Lower Alloways Creek Township Committee are Mayor Timothy W. Bradway (I, term on township committee ends December 31, 2024;term as mayor ends 2022), Paul M. Collier (R, 2022), Laura Tice Crane (R, 2024), Jeffrey P. Palombo (R, 2022) and Richard W. Venable Sr. (I, 2023).

In 2018, the township had an average property tax bill of $2,157, the lowest in the county, compared to an average bill of $5,711 in Salem County and $8,767 statewide.

Federal, state and county representation 
Lower Alloways Creek Township is located in the 2nd Congressional District and is part of New Jersey's 3rd state legislative district.

 

Salem County is governed by a five-member Board of County Commissioners who are elected at-large to serve three-year terms of office on a staggered basis, with either one or two seats coming up for election each year. At an annual reorganization meeting held in the beginning of January, the board selects a Director and a Deputy Director from among its members. , Salem County's Commissioners (with party, residence and term-end year listed in parentheses) are 
Director Benjamin H. Laury (R, Elmer, term as commissioner ends December 31, 2024; term as director ends 2022), 
Deputy Director Gordon J. "Mickey" Ostrum, Jr. (R, Pilesgrove Township, term as commissioner ends 2024; term as deputy director ends 2022),  
R. Scott Griscom (R, Mannington Township, 2022), 
Edward A. Ramsay (R, Pittsgrove Township, 2023) and
Lee R. Ware (D, Elsinboro Township, 2022). Constitutional officers elected on a countywide basis are 
County Clerk Dale A. Cross (R, 2024),
Sheriff Charles M. Miller (R, 2024) and 
Surrogate Nicki A. Burke (D, 2023).

Politics
As of March 23, 2011, there were a total of 1,302 registered voters in Lower Alloways Creek Township, of which 461 (35.4% vs. 30.6% countywide) were registered as Democrats, 337 (25.9% vs. 21.0%) were registered as Republicans and 503 (38.6% vs. 48.4%) were registered as Unaffiliated. There was one voter registered to another party. Among the township's 2010 Census population, 73.6% (vs. 64.6% in Salem County) were registered to vote, including 94.1% of those ages 18 and over (vs. 84.4% countywide).

In the 2012 presidential election, Republican Mitt Romney received 65.7% of the vote (620 cast), ahead of Democrat Barack Obama with 33.2% (313 votes), and other candidates with 1.2% (11 votes), among the 1,153 ballots cast by the township's 1,313 registered voters (209 ballots were spoiled), for a turnout of 87.8%. In the 2008 presidential election, Republican John McCain received 657 votes (65.2% vs. 46.6% countywide), ahead of Democrat Barack Obama with 316 votes (31.4% vs. 50.4%) and other candidates with 23 votes (2.3% vs. 1.6%), among the 1,007 ballots cast by the township's 1,323 registered voters, for a turnout of 76.1% (vs. 71.8% in Salem County). In the 2004 presidential election, Republican George W. Bush received 761 votes (70.0% vs. 52.5% countywide), ahead of Democrat John Kerry with 313 votes (28.8% vs. 45.9%) and other candidates with 9 votes (0.8% vs. 1.0%), among the 1,087 ballots cast by the township's 1,358 registered voters, for a turnout of 80.0% (vs. 71.0% in the whole county).

In the 2013 gubernatorial election, Republican Chris Christie received 78.9% of the vote (597 cast), ahead of Democrat Barbara Buono with 19.8% (150 votes), and other candidates with 1.3% (10 votes), among the 772 ballots cast by the township's 1,330 registered voters (15 ballots were spoiled), for a turnout of 58.0%. In the 2009 gubernatorial election, Republican Chris Christie received 438 votes (53.5% vs. 46.1% countywide), ahead of Democrat Jon Corzine with 248 votes (30.3% vs. 39.9%), Independent Chris Daggett with 95 votes (11.6% vs. 9.7%) and other candidates with 19 votes (2.3% vs. 2.0%), among the 819 ballots cast by the township's 1,328 registered voters, yielding a 61.7% turnout (vs. 47.3% in the county).

Education

The Lower Alloways Creek Township School District serves students in pre-kindergarten through eighth grade at Lower Alloways Creek Elementary School. As of the 2018–2019 school year, the district, comprised of one school, had an enrollment of 167 students and 20.2 classroom teachers (on an FTE basis), for a student–teacher ratio of 8.3:1. In the 2016–2017 school year, Lower Alloways Creek Township had the 32nd smallest enrollment of any school district in the state, with 159 students.

Public school students in ninth through twelfth grades attend Salem High School in Salem City, together with students from Elsinboro Township, Mannington Township and Quinton Township, as part of a sending/receiving relationship with the Salem City School District. As of the 2018–2019 school year, the high school had an enrollment of 374 students and 44.0 classroom teachers (on an FTE basis), for a student–teacher ratio of 8.5:1.

Transportation

No Interstate, U.S., state or major county highways pass through Lower Alloways Creek Township. The only numbered roads are minor county routes, such as County Route 623.

Route 45 and Route 49 are the closest state highways, and are accessible in neighboring municipalities. The closest limited access roads, Interstate 295 and the New Jersey Turnpike, are accessible two towns away in Pennsville Township.

Notable people

People who were born in, residents of, or otherwise closely associated with Lower Alloways Creek Township include:

 William Hancock, judges. Hancock Sr. commissioned Hancock House in 1734. Hancock Jr. was killed in 1778 in the Hancock's Bridge massacre
 Thomas Jones Yorke (1801–1882), Whig Party politician who served two terms in the United States House of Representatives

References

External links

Lower Alloways Creek Township official website
Lower Alloways Creek Elementary School

School Data for the Lower Alloways Creek Elementary School, National Center for Education Statistics

 
1767 establishments in New Jersey
Populated places established in 1767
Township form of New Jersey government
Townships in Salem County, New Jersey
New Jersey populated places on the Delaware River